Oliver Township is an active township in Taney County, in the U.S. state of Missouri.

Oliver Township is named for the local Oliver family.

The Ralph Foster Museum is within the township boundaries.

References

Townships in Missouri
Townships in Taney County, Missouri